Ghazipur Lok Sabha constituency (sometimes spelt 'Gazipur') is one of the 80 Lok Sabha (parliamentary) constituencies in Uttar Pradesh state in northern India. This constituency covers part of Ghazipur district.

Vidhan Sabha Segments
Presently, Ghazipur Lok Sabha constituency comprises five Vidhan Sabha (legislative assembly) segments. These are:

Members of Lok Sabha

Election results

2019 Lok Sabha

2014 Election

1971 Lok Sabha
 Sarjoo Pandey (CPI) : 135,703 votes 
 Shri Narain Singh (NCO) : 70210 
 Ram Surat Rai (SOC) : 34688
 Satya Narain (BKD) : 24293

1962 Lok Sabha
V. S. Gahmari (INC) : 77,046 votes    
 Har Prasad (CPI) : 40,183

See also
 Ghazipur district
 List of Constituencies of the Lok Sabha

References

External links
Ghazipur lok sabha  constituency election 2019 result details

Lok Sabha constituencies in Uttar Pradesh
Politics of Ghazipur district